Vladimir Štimac (born August 25, 1987) is a Serbian professional basketball player who most recently played for the Ningbo Rockets of the Chinese Basketball Association (CBA). He also represented the Serbian national team internationally.

Professional career
Štimac grew up with Beovuk 72 youth team, and later spent two years in Lithuania and one in Latvia before returning to Serbia. During his first season abroad, he played for the Lithuanian Žalgiris reserves team and earned his way into the first team for the following season. In order to get a chance to play as a first-team regular, he was allowed to spend his third SEB BBL year with Latvian side Valmiera, where he was unanimously chosen as the best player for the 2007–08 season.

He played for the Orlando Magic in the Orlando Pro Summer League in 2010. In September 2010, he signed with the Latvian team Ventspils but was released two months later. In November 2010, he signed a contract for the remainder of the season with Nymburk.

In July 2011, he signed a one-year contract with Olin Edirne Basket. In 30 games of Turkish League, he averaged 14.8 points and 9.9 rebounds per game. For the 2012–13 season he moved to Banvit.

In September 2013, he signed a 1+1 contract with the Spanish club Unicaja Málaga. In June 2014, he left Unicaja.

In August 2014, he signed a one-year deal with Bayern Munich.

On October 2, 2015, he signed a preliminary agreement with the Spanish team Estudiantes. On October 27, 2015, he returned to Crvena zvezda signing a contract for the rest of the season.

On August 31, 2016, Štimac signed with the Turkish club Beşiktaş for the 2016–17 season.

On August 22, 2017, Štimac signed a one-year deal, with an option for another, with Turkish club Anadolu Efes.

On July 12, 2018, Štimac signed with Türk Telekom for the 2018–19 season.

2019–present
On September 25, 2019, he signed a three-month contract with Turkish EuroLeague team Fenerbahçe. He appeared in 8 EuroLeague games, averaging 4.6 points per game. In the midseason, on December 25, he returned to Crvena zvezda. In 13 EuroLeague games with Crvena zvezda until the end of the season, which was cut short due to the COVID-19 pandemic, he averaged 11.1 points and 6.2 rebounds per game.

On August 22, 2020, Štimac signed with the French team AS Monaco. However on September 12, his contract was bought out by the Qingdao Eagles in China. On February 2, 2021, he has signed with Bahçeşehir Koleji of the Turkish Basketball Super League (BSL).

In December 2021, Štimac returned to China and signed with Ningbo Rockets. On December 26, 2021, he recorded career-high 40 points, 17 rebounds and 7 assists in a game against the Sichuan Blue Whales.

Serbian national team

He managed to win a 2007 U20 European Championship gold medal as a member of the Serbian U20 National Team 2007.

Štimac represented the Serbian national basketball team at the EuroBasket 2013. He was a member of the Serbian national basketball team that won the silver medal at the 2014 FIBA Basketball World Cup and at the 2016 Summer Olympics.

Štimac also represented Serbia at the 2016 Summer Olympics where they won the silver medal, after losing to the United States in the final game with 96–66.

Štimac also represented Serbia at the EuroBasket 2017 where they won the silver medal, after losing in the final game to Slovenia.

Career statistics

EuroLeague

|-
| style="text-align:left;"| 2006–07
| style="text-align:left;"| Žalgiris
| 2 || 1 || 18.0 || .600 || .000 || .333 || 4.0 || .5 || .0 || .0 || 4.0 || 6.5
|-
| style="text-align:left;"| 2013–14
| style="text-align:left;"| Unicaja
| 23 || 4 || 17.2 || .603 || .000 || .524 || 5.1 || .6 || .3 || .4 || 7.6 || 9.9
|-
| style="text-align:left;"| 2014–15
| style="text-align:left;"| Bayern
| 10 || 2 || 15.3 || .542 || .333 || .667 || 4.1 || .6 || .2 || .2 || 6.9 || 7.8
|-
| style="text-align:left;"| 2015–16
| style="text-align:left;"| Crvena zvezda
| 25 || 0 || 14.6 || .550 || .000 || .594 || 5.0 || .5 || .3 || .2 || 6.9 || 9.2
|-
| style="text-align:left;"| 2017–18
| style="text-align:left;"| Anadolu Efes
| 30 || 11 || 18.3 || .583 || .000 || .694 || 5.8 || 1.0 || .6 || .3 || 9.4 || 13.9
|-
| style="text-align:left;" rowspan="2"| 2019–20
| style="text-align:left;"| Fenerbahçe
| 8 || 0 || 10.1 || .700 || .000 || .692 || .4 || .0 || .0 || .0 || 4.6 || 5.6
|-
| style="text-align:left;"| Crvena zvezda
| 13 || 4 || 22.9 || .596 || .375 || .659 || 6.2 || 1.1 || .5 || .5 || 11.1 || 14.0
|- class="sortbottom"
| style="text-align:center;" colspan="2"| Career
| 111 || 22 || 16.6 || .590 || .250 || .629 || 5.1 || .7 || .4 || .3 || 8.0 || 10.7

See also
List of Olympic medalists in basketball

References

External links

Vladimir Štimac at aba-liga.com
Vladimir Štimac at euroleague.net
Vladimir Štimac at fiba.com
Vladimir Štimac at tblstat.net

1987 births
Living people
2014 FIBA Basketball World Cup players
ABA League players
Anadolu Efes S.K. players
Bahçeşehir Koleji S.K. players
Basketball League of Serbia players
Baloncesto Málaga players
Bandırma B.İ.K. players
Basketball players at the 2016 Summer Olympics
BC Žalgiris players
BC Žalgiris-2 players
Beşiktaş men's basketball players
BK Valmiera players
BK Ventspils players
CB Estudiantes players
Centers (basketball)
Basketball Nymburk players
Eskişehir Basket players
FC Bayern Munich basketball players
Fenerbahçe men's basketball players
KK Beovuk 72 players
KK Crvena zvezda players
Liga ACB players
Medalists at the 2009 Summer Universiade
Medalists at the 2011 Summer Universiade
Medalists at the 2016 Summer Olympics
Olympic basketball players of Serbia
Olympic medalists in basketball
Olympic silver medalists for Serbia
Serbia men's national basketball team players
Serbian expatriate basketball people in China
Serbian expatriate basketball people in the Czech Republic
Serbian expatriate basketball people in Latvia
Serbian expatriate basketball people in Lithuania
Serbian expatriate basketball people in Spain
Serbian expatriate basketball people in Turkey
Serbian men's basketball players
Basketball players from Belgrade
Türk Telekom B.K. players
Universiade gold medalists for Serbia
Universiade medalists in basketball